Bagha Municipality is a Class A municipality in the Bagha Upazila of Rajshahi District in the Rajshahi Division of Bangladesh.

Administrative area
Ward: 09

Locality: 20
Bolihar
Chak-Amodpur
Milik Bagha
Baju Bagha
Chak-Chatari
Chatari
Chak-Narayanpur
Koligram
Gaopara
Hizalpalli
Baniyapara
Chondipur
Murshidpur
Jotsayestha
Khayerhat
Pakuriya
Bagsayesta
Nischintopur

Mouza: 17

Area and population
Total area: 15.78 km2

Total population(As of census): 75,000

Total population(As of municipality own statistics): 55,000

Number of voters: 27,789 (31-10-2008)

Number of families: 10,270

Number of holdings: 8,899 (Including public/private)

Education
Education rate: 60℅

Educational institutions:
 College - 04
 High school - 07
 Primary school - 10
 Madrasah - 01
 Kindergarten - 04

See also
Bagha Upazila
Rajshahi District
Rajshahi Division
List of municipal corporations in Bangladesh

References 

Populated places in Rajshahi District
Municipalities in Rajshahi District